Rackenford and Knowstone Moors is a nature reserve of the Devon Wildlife Trust, situated about  north-west of Tiverton, in Devon, England. The habitat is culm grassland.

Description
The reserve is a Site of Special Scientific Interest and a Special Area of Conservation.

Culm grassland is found in poorly drained lowland areas of acidic soil where there is high rainfall. The vegetation includes abundant purple moor grass and sharp-flowered rush.

Over the last century, over 90% of culm grassland has been lost. The remaining parts are mostly in fragmented areas in north Devon; the most extensive fragment is this reserve. The Trust endeavours to protect, re-establish and link together isolated sites of culm grassland. In the reserve there is light grazing by cattle and deer; the low-intensity land management, little changed from prehistoric times, allows a wide diversity of plant species.

Species
In the wetter areas, besides purple moor grass and sharp-flowered rush, species include ragged-robin, meadowsweet and wild angelica; in waterlogged areas there is sphagnum moss and sundew. In dry areas there is saw-wort, thistles and heathers. The plants support many species of butterflies, such as small pearl-bordered fritillary, marbled white and dingy skipper; birds including curlew, snipe and reed bunting may be found.

Prehistoric site

See also
 Culm Measures
 Dunsdon National Nature Reserve

References

External links
 Rackenford and Knowstone Moors leaflet of Devon Wildlife Trust
 "Culm Grassland Natural Flood Management Project" Devon Wildlife Trust

Nature reserves in Devon
Grasslands of the United Kingdom
Sites of Special Scientific Interest in Devon
Special Areas of Conservation in England